Gordon Baldwin (born March 1, 1987) is a Canadian former professional ice hockey player who last played for the Sheffield Steelers of the Elite Ice Hockey League (EIHL).

Playing career
Baldwin had previously played for the Abbotsford Heat of the American Hockey League (AHL) as a prospect for the Calgary Flames of the National Hockey League (NHL). He was selected by the Flames in the third-round, 69th overall, in the 2005 NHL Entry Draft. He became a free agent following the 2010–11 season, and signed with BK Mladá Boleslav on July 25, 2011.

Baldwin returned to North America for the 2012–13 season, signing an ECHL contract with the Idaho Steelheads. He later signed a professional try-out with affiliate, the Texas Stars of the AHL on December 28, 2012.

On August 1, 2013, Baldwin signed a two-year contract with United Kingdom club, the Sheffield Steelers of the EIHL. Upon the conclusion of his second season with the Steelers, Baldwin announced the end of his professional playing career, accepting an assistant coaching role with former ECHL club, the Idaho Steelheads on September 24, 2015.

His younger brother Corbin Baldwin is also a professional hockey defenceman who played in the AHL (Iowa Wild) and EIHL (Guildford Flames).

Career statistics

References

External links

1987 births
Abbotsford Heat players
BK Mladá Boleslav players
Calgary Flames draft picks
Canadian ice hockey defencemen
Idaho Steelheads (ECHL) players
Las Vegas Wranglers players
Living people
Medicine Hat Tigers players
Quad City Flames players
Sheffield Steelers players
Texas Stars players
Ice hockey people from Winnipeg
Canadian expatriate ice hockey players in England
Canadian expatriate ice hockey players in the Czech Republic
Canadian expatriate ice hockey players in the United States